KZPR (105.3 FM, "The Fox 105.3") is a mainstream rock formatted radio station in Minot, North Dakota, owned by iHeartMedia, Inc. The station began as a classic rock station but has evolved into a mainstream rock station in recent years, and competes with classic rock formatted KTZU "94.9 The Zoo"

External links
The Fox 105.3 website

ZPR
Active rock radio stations in the United States
Radio stations established in 1985
IHeartMedia radio stations